Ravni Dol is a small settlement in the hills west of Ribnica in southern Slovenia. It belongs to the Municipality of Sodražica. The area is part of the traditional region of Lower Carniola and is now included in the Southeast Slovenia Statistical Region.

Mass graves
Ravni Dol is the site of five known mass graves associated with the Second World War. The Travna Gora 1–4 mass graves are located at four sites west of Ravni Dol, directly south of the Travna Gora Lodge. The fourth grave is marked by a wooden cross below the road. The graves contain the remains of 48 prisoners of war from the prison in Kočevje murdered by the Partisan Šercer Brigade on 2 November 1943 in revenge for the escape of 10 prisoners that killed a guard near Glažuta. It contains the remains of Slovenes from Travna Gora.

References

External links
Ravni Dol on Geopedia

Populated places in the Municipality of Sodražica